Enrico Porro (Enrico Aldanian, 16 January 1885 – 14 March 1967) was an Italian Greco-Roman wrestler and Olympic champion. He was the first gold medal at the Olympic Games of the Italian military sports body Gruppo Sportivo della Marina Militare (the sport section of the Italian armed force Italian Navy).

Biography
Porro competed at the 1908 Summer Olympics in London where he won the gold medal in Greco-Roman wrestling, the lightweight class. He also competed at the 1920 and 1924 Summer Olympics.

See also
 Italy at the 1908 Summer Olympics

References

External links
 
 
 
 

1885 births
1967 deaths
Italian male sport wrestlers
Olympic wrestlers of Italy
Wrestlers at the 1908 Summer Olympics
Wrestlers at the 1920 Summer Olympics
Wrestlers at the 1924 Summer Olympics
Olympic gold medalists for Italy
Olympic medalists in wrestling
Medalists at the 1908 Summer Olympics
Italian people of Armenian descent
Wrestlers of Marina Militare